Jakey Boy may refer to the following:

Jake Stevens, an Irish television personality and musician
"Merry Christmas Jakey Boy", a top ten Christmas single released by Stevens